The Chrysler Town & Country is a minivan that was manufactured and marketed by Chrysler from 1990 to the 2016 model years. The third of the Chrysler minivans introduced, the 1990 Town & Country shared its nameplate with the flagship Chrysler station wagon produced from 1941 to 1988. Five generations of the model line were produced, with the Town & Country positioned as the flagship luxury minivan trim package, slotted above the extended wheelbase Dodge Grand Caravan and Plymouth Grand Voyager.

After the 2016 model year, Chrysler retired the Town & Country nameplate for Chrysler-division minivans, with the sixth-generation 2017 vehicles adopting the Chrysler Pacifica nameplate. At the time the Town & Country was withdrawn, Chrysler marked the sale of its 12 millionth minivans (combined under three nameplates). Produced nearly continuously for 75 years, the Town & Country nameplate is the longest-produced Chrysler nameplate and is second only to the Chevrolet Suburban in worldwide automotive history.

The first three generations of the minivan were produced by Chrysler in Fenton, Missouri (Saint Louis Assembly); the fourth generation was also produced in Taiwan by China Motor Corporation in Yangmei District, Taoyuan while the fourth and fifth generations were also produced by Chrysler Canada in Windsor, Ontario (Windsor Assembly).

First generation (1990)

Originally slated for a 1989 model-year release, the Chrysler Town & Country minivan was introduced in the spring of 1989 as an early 1990 model (before marketing began of the 1990 Dodge and Plymouth counterparts). The delay would lead to the first time since 1945 that Chrysler did not offer any version of the Town & Country (having sold the model line as a station wagon for 48 years). Alongside the retirement of the Chrysler K-Car station wagon, the release of the Town & Country minivan coincided with the introduction of higher-end vehicles in the segment such as the Oldsmobile Silhouette and later the Mercury Villager. While its 1982–1988 namesake was a station wagon counterpart of the LeBaron sedan, the Town & Country minivan was now equipped in line with larger Chrysler sedans, including the New Yorker Landau and Fifth Avenue.

Sharing its body with the Dodge Grand Caravan and Plymouth Grand Voyager, the 1990 Town & Country adopted the Chrysler S platform. The Town & Country originally featured the 142 hp 3.0L Mitsubishi 6G72 V6 used across Chrysler's model line. This was upgraded to Chrysler's own 150 hp 3.3 L EGA V6, shared with its Dodge and Plymouth counterparts and the larger Chrysler sedans, as a running change in the summer of 1989. While all first-generation examples were produced as 1990 models, examples with the 3.0 L V6 were certified as 1989 model-year vehicles by the United States Environmental Protection Agency. Both engines were paired solely with a 4-speed "Ultradrive" automatic transmission.

Introduced roughly 18 months before the release of its second-generation successor, another objective behind the development of the model line was to repurpose pre-manufactured long-wheelbase bodies already slated to be sold as Grand Caravans/Grand Voyagers. To minimize any potential tooling costs of a distinct nameplate, the Town & Country was externally distinguished from its counterparts with relatively few changes. Initially offered solely in white, black was added as an optional color in June 1989; all versions were produced with a tan interior.

Retaining its traditional exterior (simulated) wood trim (from LE-trim Voyagers/Caravans), the model line was styled with a largely monochrome exterior (with body-color bumpers and side mirrors). While the grille was designed specifically for the Town & Country (adopting the Chrysler lettering from the export Voyager), the 15-inch wheels were shared with the Voyager LX (painted white), with the lower body cladding shared with the Caravan ES (slightly extended to compensate for the longer wheelbase); shared with the New Yorker and Fifth Avenue, the Town & Country received a crystal Chrysler Pentastar hood ornament. The interior was trimmed with leather seats and leather door panels (adopting a more contemporary design than Chrysler sedans), along with upgraded wood trim. In contrast to LE-trim Dodge and Plymouth minivans, the Town & Country was equipped with effectively every feature, including power windows and locks, seven-passenger seating, roof luggage rack, and front and rear air conditioning; the Infinity sound system was shared with the Imperial.

In total, Chrysler produced 1,789 examples in 1989 and 3,615 during 1990.

Engines
 3.0 L Mitsubishi 6G72 V6, 
 3.3 L EGA V6,  (after July 1989)

Second generation (1991–1995)

Introduced in November 1990, the 1991 through 1995 Town & Country used the Chrysler AS platform. This was the last Town & Country that was derived from the Chrysler K platform. As with the previous generation, the Generation II Town & Country came fully equipped, with no actual trim levels but only additional options — and continuing exclusively in the long-wheelbase (LWB) format.

This generation Town & Country shared the Plymouth Voyager's headlight and taillight clusters; the Dodge Caravan had its own. The Town & Country was set apart on the exterior by its chrome (later body-colored) waterfall grille, crystal Pentastar hood ornament, body-colored side mirrors, bodyside cladding, and unique alloy wheels. The interior of the Town & Country included standard leather seating surfaces, woodgrain dashboard and door trim, as well as a digital instrument cluster.

Innovations
 "Quad Command" bucket seating, made standard on the Town & Country (MY1992)
 Integrated child safety seats (1991, MY1992), improved design with recliners (1993, MY1994)
 Available anti-lock brakes
 First driver's side airbag in a minivan (1991), made standard (1991, MY1992)
 First minivan to meet 1998 U.S. federal safety standards (1993, MY1994)

Engines
 1991–1993: 3.3 L EGA V6, 
 1994–1995: 3.8 L EGH V6,

Year-to-year changes
1991: For its second model year as a minivan, the Chrysler Town & Country is completely redesigned with improved aerosharps and less sharp corners, and had the 250-watt Chrysler Infinity audio system.
1992: The Town & Country was available with all-wheel drive and integrated child safety seats. Now standard were a driver's side airbag (from August 1991 production) and quad command bucket seating. On the exterior, the Town & Country was available with a vinyl woodgrain delete option. If buyers opted for this, the woodgrain siding was replaced by a gold pinstripe along the beltline. New gold web-design alloy wheels were available.
1993: There were several interior revisions. On the exterior, a stainless steel exhaust system and new available wheel designs greeted buyers for 1993.
1994: Launched in November 1993, a redesigned dashboard and instrument panel was new for 1994. All 1994 Town & Country's were given a passenger's side airbag and knee bolsters. Side door guard beams were installed this year, so that they met 1998 federal side impact standards. Also made standard was a 3.8 L V6 engine.
1995: The fob for the standard remote keyless entry had to be pressed twice within five seconds to prevent the accidental opening of the liftgate. 1995 would be the last model year for the K-based Town & Country. A completely new cab-forward styled Town & Country would be introduced in early 1995 as a 1996 model.

Third generation (1996–2000)

The 1996 redesign used the Chrysler NS platform and included several industry firsts, including a driver's side sliding door and a seating management system marketed as Easy Out Roller Seats. With Generation III, the Town & Country was able to cover a wider customer base through new designated trim levels. The premium LXi (and later Limited) included amenities such as pre-programmed driver's seat and mirror, standard leather interior, 8-way power-adjustable front seats, Infinity sound system with cassette/CD player, and dual-driver/passenger climate control to name a few. An unnamed entry-level model (later redesignated LX) featured fewer amenities in a long-wheelbase (LWB) form. The LX model (later redesignated SX) featured similar content in a short-wheelbase (SWB) form. Both Base and LX models were intended to fill the gap left by the discontinuation of the upscale LX model of the Plymouth Voyager/Grand Voyager which had been discontinued for the third generation. Generation III Town & Countries were the first to feature the historic Chrysler blue ribbon emblem (later incorporated into the winged emblem), which dates from the 1930s.

Engines included a 3.3 L gasoline-powered engine (8th VIN digit R), a 3.3 L flexible-fuel 3.3 L engine (8th VIN digit G), and a 3.8 L engine (8th VIN digit L). In Canada, Town & Country models came standard with the 3.8 L V6 and were offered only in long-wheelbase (LWB) versions.

In 1999, Chrysler presented a concept minivan, the Pacifica using the Town & Country's body shell and bearing resemblance to the Town & Country and the LHS.

Generation III examples of the Town & Country with only the passenger side sliding door (vs. both rear sliding doors) were only offered for 1996. Car and Driver included the Town & Country on their Ten Best list for 1996 and 1997.

Engines
 1996–2000: 3.3 L EGA V6, 
 1996–1997: 3.8 L EGH V6, 
 1998–2000: 3.8 L EGH V6,

Year-to-year changes
1996: The redesigned Generation III Town & Country is introduced with a short-wheelbase LX model and two long-wheelbase models: an unnamed base model and the LXi. Early minivans had discrete grab handles on the front interior door panels; they were integrated into the front door armrests as a running change during this model year. Another running change during this model year saw the elimination of the plastic intake manifold cover on the 3.8 L engine. The 3.8 L engine was standard on the LXi and optional on the LX and Base.
1997: Permanent all-wheel drive arrived as an option for 1997 on long-wheelbase minivans, and all-wheel drive models got 4-wheel disc brakes. Front-wheel drive minivans gained a new traction control system, which worked at low speeds to prevent wheel slippage. The rear driver's side sliding door was standard on all 1997 Town & Countries. The short-wheelbase model was redesignated SX, with the LX designation being given to the previously unnamed long-wheelbase base model.
1998: A new front fascia was introduced, replacing the waterfall grille with a black eggcrate grille and a winged version of the Chrysler ribboned badge. The new front fascia also featured a larger, more aggressive-looking bumper with new headlights that offered better illumination and round fog lights. SX and LX models equipped with cloth interiors received new cloth upholstery. Additionally, the design of the auto-dimming rearview mirror was updated to include a sensor for automatic headlights. HVAC vents on the driver's side and center of the dashboard were updated to a more conventional design in calendar year 1998 
1999: The exterior emblems were changed to use a new font. The middle bench seat was dropped in some models for 1999, and a child seat was now available in one of the two reclining middle-row buckets. Other additions included a small cargo net between the front seats. Another model, the top-of-the-line Limited, was also available for 1999. Among other features of the Limited were a new third-row bench that featured higher bucket-like backs on the left and right sides, chrome exterior door handles, and 16" chrome alloy wheels.
2000: The short-wheelbase SX was dropped for 2000, leaving only extended-wheelbase models, along with new interior and exterior colors. All models seated seven and had sliding doors on both sides. A new Rear Seat Video entertainment system, with a VCR and 6.4-inch display screen, was available as a dealer-installed option.

Crash test results
The 1996–2000 Dodge Grand Caravan (twin of the Town & Country) received a "Marginal" rating in the Insurance Institute for Highway Safety's 40 mph offset test. The structural performance and restraints were graded "Acceptable", but the foot injuries were very high.

In the U.S. National Highway Traffic Safety Administration (NHTSA) crash tests, it received 4 stars for the driver and front passenger in the frontal-impact. In the side-impact test, it received five stars for the driver, and 3 stars for the rear occupant, and resulted in a fuel leak that could cause a fire hazard.

Despite bad results in the Euro NCAP crash tests, statistics from the real world indicate that this is not the whole picture. Folksam is a Swedish insurance company that in May 2009 published a report on injuries and survivability of 172 car models. The 1988–95 generation received a real-world rating of "Average", and the 1996-00 generation got a rating called "Safest" (at least 30% safer than the average car.)

Fourth generation (2001–2007)

The fourth-generation Town & Country went on sale in January 2000 as a 2001 model. It was redesigned using the Chrysler RS platform and initially available only in long-wheelbase (LWB) form.

Chrysler's short-wheelbase minivan was marketed using the Voyager nameplate, which had been transferred to the Chrysler line in mid-2000 when the Plymouth brand was discontinued. After 2003, the Voyager nameplate was dropped and the short-wheelbase (SWB) versions were once again part of the Town & Country lineup.

Trim levels for 2001 were carried over from the previous generation. They included the entry-level LX, mid-level LXi, and the range-topping Limited. By 2002, extra feature packed eL and eX models were added. These were value-priced versions of the LX and LXi, respectively, that included the most popular option packages.

The 2004 model year included a new unnamed base short-wheelbase model. The LX, LXi, and Limited were the Canadian trim levels, but only the LXi and Limited were sold to retail consumers. The lowest level LX was restricted to fleet sales.

The 2005 Town & Country received a mid-cycle refresh including revised exterior styling and a mildly restyled interior. The most significant change was the introduction of Stow'n Go, a system of second and third-row seating that folded completely into under-floor compartments. The redesigned 2nd- and 3rd-row seats also meant the elimination of the all-wheel drive system. The Stow'n Go system was prominently featured in this model's marketing campaign.

For the remainder of this generation, the Town & Country was available in the short-wheelbase base model, and long-wheelbase LX, Touring, and Limited models. As with the pre-refresh model, only the Touring and Limited were sold to consumers in Canada, the LX being restricted to fleets.

A driver's side knee airbag was now standard on all models. The front seat-mounted side airbags of previous years were discontinued in favor of side-curtain airbags for all three rows. These were standard on Limited trim and optional on all other models, however could not be ordered with the moonroof option. Uconnect Bluetooth phone pairing was now available, as well as an overhead rail storage system with three moveable or removable compartments.

Engines

Some Town & Country models with the 3.3 L V6 from 1998 to 2003, and all models with the 3.3 L V6 from 2004–2007 can use E85 fuel. For more details on these engines see this article.

Safety
The 4th generation Town & Country (Grand Voyager, as it is known in Europe))right hand drive (RHD) version performed very poorly in the Euro NCAP car safety tests and achieved the following ratings:

In the tests, the LHD car performed significantly better than the RHD car in the frontal impact, scoring 9 points, giving a potential four star adult occupant rating."
Thatcham's New Car Whiplash Ratings (NCWR) organization tested the 4th generation European Grand Voyager for its ability to protect occupants against whiplash injuries with the car achieving an 'Acceptable' rating overall.

Security
The Grand Voyager was tested by Thatcham's New Vehicle Security Ratings (NVSR) organisation and achieved the following ratings:

Fifth generation (2008–2016)

2008 model year
Chrysler debuted the 2008 model year Town & Country went on sale on August 16, 2007 as a 2008 model. The short-wheelbase model was discontinued.

The minivans featured styling by Ralph Gilles, a six-speed automatic, a new 4.0 L V6 engine as standard on the Limited model — and a system of second row seats that swiveled to face the third row — marketed as Swivel'n Go seating. A small table, which stored in the bins below the floor, could be positioned between the two rear rows when they were facing each other. Much like its competitors, the Toyota Sienna and Honda Odyssey, the Town & Country now featured power windows on the sliding doors and moved the gear shift from the steering column to the center console, in a higher position. Another new feature of this generation was an available rear overhead console which featured LED map lights as well as halo ambient lighting. A new DVD system was also available, which featured dual screens for the rear passengers. SIRIUS Backseat TV was also offered, which featured three channels of children's programming (Nickelodeon, Disney Channel, and Cartoon Network).

A version of this vehicle is sold in several export markets (Australia/South Africa/Middle East/China/Singapore/Russia) as the Chrysler Grand Voyager. In Continental Europe, it was rebadged as the Lancia Voyager from the 2011 model year and up. Before 2011 it was sold as a Chrysler. Since 1991, the model has been sold in the Philippines under the Town and Country nameplate. In the Philippine market, the powertrain options are identical to those of the European Grand Voyager with a 2.8 L turbodiesel I4 as standard and an optional gasoline V6 (initially the 3.8 L "EGH", later upgraded to the 3.8 L "Pentastar). Both engines were mated to a 6-speed automatic transmission.

Production at the St. Louis plant ended in late 2008 in a bid to save money, but continued at Windsor Assembly in Ontario, Canada.

Trim Levels

The Town & Country was offered in many distinct trim levels:

The LX, from 2008–2010, served as the "base" Town & Country trim level. Standard features included a 3.3 L V6 engine, a 4-speed automatic transmission, an AM/FM stereo with CD player and a 4-speaker sound system, sixteen-inch (16") black-painted steel wheels with plastic wheel covers, stain-repellent cloth seating surfaces, keyless entry, wood interior trim accents, carpeted floor mats, and Chrysler's Stow 'N' Go fold-in-floor seating system. The trim level, which was discontinued after 2010, was reintroduced for 2015, once again as the "base" Town & Country trim level. For 2015, it included a 3.6 L "Pentastar" VVT V6 engine, a 6-speed automatic transmission, seventeen-inch alloy wheels, leather-trimmed seating surfaces, a touch-screen sound system, a 6-speaker sound system, power-sliding rear doors and a power tailgate, a rear-seat DVD entertainment system, and a security system.

The Touring had been the "midrange" Town & Country trim level since 2008. From 2008 to 2010, it added the following equipment to the base LX trim level: a 3.8 L V6 engine, sixteen-inch alloy wheels, an AM/FM stereo with CD/MP3 player and a 6-speaker sound system, a security system, second-row bucket seats, power-sliding rear doors and a power tailgate, and power second-row windows and third-row vent windows. Since 2011, it has included the following features (it was the "base" trim level from 2011 to 2014): a 3.6 L "Pentastar" VVT V6 engine, a 6-speed automatic transmission, leather-trimmed seating surfaces, a touch-screen sound system, power-sliding rear doors and a power tailgate, power second-row windows and third-row vent windows, and a rear-seat DVD entertainment system.

The S was the "sporty" Town & Country trim level since 2014. It added dark-finished alloy wheels, a darkened front grille, darkened front headlamps, and unique leather-trimmed seating surfaces to the midrange Touring trim level.

The Touring L was the "upgraded" Town & Country trim level since 2012. It adds heated front bucket seats, a third-row DVD entertainment system screen, and upgraded eighteen-inch (18") alloy wheels to the midrange Touring trim level.

The Limited was the top-of-the-line Town & Country trim level from 2008 to 2014. From 2008 to 2010, it added the following features to the midrange Touring trim level: a 4.0 L V6 engine, a 6-speed automatic transmission, a touch-screen sound system with rear DVD entertainment system, leather-trimmed seating surfaces, a 9-speaker premium 506-watt surround-sound system with external amplifier and subwoofer, and chrome wheels. From 2011 to 2014, it added the following features to the midrange Touring trim level: a 9-speaker premium 506-watt surround-sound system with external amplifier and subwoofer, and upgraded interior trim. In 2015, the Limited Platinum replaced the Limited as the top-of-the-line Town & Country Trim level, and the standard upgraded premium surround-sound system was dropped from the standard equipment list.

The Limited Platinum has been the top-of-the-line Town & Country trim level since 2015. It adds the following features to the Limited trim level: special alloy wheels, upgraded interior trim, and a 9-speaker premium 506-watt surround-sound system with external amplifier and subwoofer.

For 2014, a 30th Anniversary Edition Town & Country was available to celebrate the minivan's 30th anniversary (Chrysler invented the term "minivan" in 1984, and the 2014 Dodge Grand Caravan also received special treatment). It added special alloy wheels, special interior trim, and special '30th Anniversary 1984–2014' emblems to the exterior of the van. For 2016, a 90th Anniversary Edition Town & Country was available to celebrate Chrysler's 90th anniversary (the company was founded in 1926). It added special interior trim and special '90th Anniversary Edition 1926–2016' emblems to the exterior of the van.

Engines

Both the 3.8  L and 4.0 L engines were paired with Chrysler's 62TE 6-speed automatic transmission with variable line pressure (VLP) technology (See Ultradrive#62TE). This transmission is standard with the new (2011 on) 3.6 L V6 engine.

Safety
In the NHTSA's New Car Assessment Program crash testing, the 2010 Chrysler Town & Country achieved a five star (top safety) rating in several categories.

Environmental impact
The 2.8 L CRD 163 hp 6-speed automatic drive train was also tested by EcoTest and was given a rating of 45 out of 100 for environmental friendliness and  star rating.

Volkswagen Routan 
Beginning with Generation V, Volkswagen began marketing the Routan, a rebadged variant of the Chrysler RT platform minivan with revised styling and content, for the Canadian, American and Mexican markets. The Routan is manufactured at Windsor Assembly alongside the Grand Caravan, debuted in 2008 at the Chicago Auto Show and with sales beginning in fall 2008, and features neither Chrysler's Stow'n Go nor Swivel'n Go seating systems, but however, features the Easy Out Roller Seats.

2010 recall
On June 3, 2010 Chrysler recalled 284,831 MY 2008 and 2009 Town & Country vehicles due to an improperly routed wiring harness inside the sliding door. A similar recall also affected 15,902 MY 2010 Volkswagen Routan vehicles.

2011 model year

2011 Chrysler Town & Country (2010–)

The Dodge Grand Caravan and Chrysler Town & Country received mid-cycle refreshes for the 2011 model year. Changes included restyled exterior and interior with all-new wing logo, standard SafetyTec (including Blind Spot Monitoring and Rear Cross Path Detection), improvement to the Stow n Go seating and storage system, a one-touch fold down feature for easier access to the third row, a new super center console and technology, a dual DVD system that can play different media at the same time, SIRIUS Backseat TV which offers three channels of childrens programming, FLO TV featuring 20 channels of live programming, Pentastar V6 (283 hp) engine replacing previous 3.8 L and 3.3 L V6 engines, six-speed automatic transmission, a new fuel economizer mode, a new instrument panel and instrument cluster, new Chrysler Brand steering wheel with integrated controls that allow the driver to operate the radio, cruise control, hands-free phone and other vehicle functions while keeping their hands on the wheel; upgraded cloth and leather seating materials; new soft-touch door trim, new heating and cooling control system. Other changes included retuned suspension with a larger front sway bar and new rear sway bar, increased rear roll center height, new spring rates, new steering gear, new front static camber setting, and lowered ride height; extra sound insulation, acoustic glass, new LED ambient lighting and center console, and new fog lights.

Canada models arrived in dealerships in the fourth quarter 2010.

Production
The 2011 Chrysler Town & Country minivan was built at Chrysler Group LLC's Windsor Assembly Plant Windsor, Ontario, Canada starting on October 1, 2010.

2012 changes 
For 2012, leather seating and a DVD rear-seat entertainment system were made standard on all Town & Country trim levels. Cloth seating remained optional on the Touring trim in Canada, and standard on the Touring trim in Mexico. In Mexico, the "L" suffix on the Touring-L trim stood for leather.

Lancia Voyager (2011–)

The Lancia Voyager is a version of Chrysler Town & Country for the European market, as a replacement of Lancia Phedra. Changes include the removal of chrome bodyside molding. The vehicle went on sale in October 2011 across Europe.

Early Italy model includes Gold trim level, a choice of two engines (283 hp 3.6L Pentastar petrol, 163 hp 2.8 L diesel), 6-speed automatic transmission, a choice of 4 body colors (Brilliant Black, Carbon Grey, Silver, Stone White), a choice of two interior colors (Black/Grey and Beige), ParkSense assisted parking system with the optional ParkView rear view camera integration, 17-inch diamond-cut alloy wheels, black roof racks, seats upholstered in high-quality leather, audio controls on the steering wheel and gear lever knob, also leather-covered, ESP, 6 airbags, cruise control, fog lights, automatic headlights, active pedestrian protection, automatic three-zone climate control, 6-speaker radio with CD player, U-Connect hands-free system with I-pod/Mp3 system, heated door mirrors, side doors and tailgate with electric control.

It remains the Chrysler Grand Voyager in the United Kingdom, Ireland, South Africa, Australia, Singapore, the Middle East, China and Russia.

2013 model year

2013 Chrysler Town & Country update
Changes for the 2013 model year included optional Blu-ray rear seat dual-screen DVD system, sharper-resolution rear-seat DVD screens for all models, a HDMI input for video game systems, two rear-seat USB ports for charging cell phones or MP3 players, standard Trailer Sway Damping, standard power-folding mirrors on Limited and optional on Touring L models, new standard leather seating surfaces on Touring models, a new 17-inch alloy wheel design for Touring L models.

Early US models include Chrysler Town & Country Touring, Town & Country Touring L and Town & Country Limited.

2013 Town & Country S
The Town & Country S was unveiled during the 2012 Los Angeles International Auto Show. The model came equipped with a black chrome grill, a black rear fascia step pad, 'S' model badging, 17-inch aluminum wheels with polished face and black-painted pockets and blacked-out headlight bezels (delayed availability), Black Torino leather seats with an 'S' logo embroidered in the seat backs and black Ballistic cloth seat inserts, grey stitching at seats and door armrests, Piano Black gloss appliques at the instrument panel and on the spokes of the black leather-wrapped steering wheel, Chrysler Winged badge on the wheel matches the black background-look of the exterior badging, a black headliner and upper consoles, black center console and an 'S' logo in the instrument cluster, dual-screen Blu-ray DVD system (HDMI input, two USB recharging ports, a 12 V outlet and a 115 V two-prong outlet), a performance suspension, and a choice of 4 body colors (Brilliant Black, Deep Cherry Red, Stone White or Billet Silver).

2013 Town & Country Tanya Moss edition
This van was a limited (150 units) version of 2013 Chrysler Town & Country for Mexico market, designed in collaboration with Mexican jewelry designer Tanya Moss.

Production
The 2013 Chrysler Town & Country minivan was built at Chrysler Group LLC's Windsor Assembly Plant in Windsor, Ontario, Canada.

2014 model year
 
Daytime running lamps are now a standard feature on US models. Previously, they were only standard on Canadian and European models; US models required dealer activation.

2014 Chrysler Town & Country 30th Anniversary Edition, Town & Country S
The "30th Anniversary Edition" was a modified version of the Touring-L trim, commemorating 30th anniversary of Chrysler Town & Country. This trim level came equipped with 17-inch aluminum wheels with polished faces and painted satin carbon pockets, '30th Anniversary' badging, Black Alcantara seat inserts with Nappa seat bolsters, Piano Black steering wheel bezels and instrument panel trim, third-row power folding seats, touchscreen radio with 30th Anniversary splash screen, 30th Anniversary logo on the key fob, rear back up camera, choice of 8 body colours (exclusive Granite Crystal Pearl Coat, Billet Silver Metallic Clear Coat, Brilliant Black Crystal Pearl Coat, Cashmere Pearl Coat, Deep Cherry Red Pearl Coat, Bright White Clear Coat, True Blue Pearl Coat, Maximum Steel Metallic Clear Coat).

The Town & Country S was carried over for the 2014 model year, which included a black chrome grille combined with black-background Chrysler Winged badges front and rear, a black rear fascia step pad, 'S' model badging, 17-inch aluminum wheels with polished face and black-painted pockets and blacked-out headlight bezels, Black Torino leather seats with an 'S' logo embroidered in the seat backs, black Ballistic cloth seat inserts, grey stitching; grey stitching at door armrests, piano black gloss appliques on the instrument panel and on the spokes of the black leather-wrapped steering wheel, Chrysler Winged badge on the wheel matches the black background-look of the exterior badging, a black headliner and upper consoles, black center console, an 'S' logo in the instrument cluster, dual-screen Blu-ray system (HDMI input, two USB recharging ports, a 12 V outlet and a 115 V two-prong outlet, wireless headphones), and a performance suspension.

The 2014 Chrysler Town & Country was available in eight exterior colors: Billet Silver Metallic Clear Coat, Brilliant Black Crystal Clear Coat, Bright White Pearl Coat, Cashmere Pearl Coat, Deep Cherry Crystal Pearl Coat, Maximum Steel Pearl Coat, Mocha Java Pearl Coat, True Blue Pearl Coat and Sapphire Crystal Metallic Clear Coat.

Production
2014 Chrysler Town & Country was built in Chrysler Group LLC's (now FCA US LLC) Windsor Assembly Plant in Windsor, Ontario, Canada.

2015 model year
For 2015, the LX model was reintroduced, now nearly identical to the Touring except for the lack of front fog lights and EVIC. Also introduced was a new Premium trim level for the Canadian market, including Alcantara and Nappa Leather faced seats, heated front and 2nd-row seats, and a heated steering wheel as standard equipment.

The Limited was succeeded as the highest level trim by the Limited Platinum, which is near identical to the previous Limited save for a few changes. The Limited still continued production, although with a few standard features removed or made optional (such as HID headlamps) due to the Limited Platinum.

Production
2015 Chrysler Town & Country was built in FCA Canada Inc's Windsor Assembly Plant in Windsor, Ontario, Canada.

2016 model year
All 2016 models were a carryover from the 2015 model year.

Projector headlamps are now standard across all trim levels in the US except for fleet vehicles; halogen projector headlamps replaced the reflector headlamps used in previous model years, HID headlamps are optional on Touring-L and Limited, and are standard on Limited Platinum. The reflector headlamps are retained on the Dodge Caravan. Last year for the Chrysler Town & Country.

Town & Country 90th Anniversary Edition
The 90th Anniversary Edition is a variant of the Touring-L commemorating the 90th anniversary of the Chrysler company, adding several optional features as standard features including heated second-row seats, a heated steering wheel, and a power sunroof. Distinguishing features are special badging, a 90th Anniversary Edition radio splash screen, and special floor mats. This model went on sale alongside the 200 90th Anniversary Edition, based on the 200 Limited, and 300 90th Anniversary Edition based on the 300 Limited.

Production
2016 Chrysler Town & Country was built at FCA Canada Inc's Windsor Assembly Plant in Windsor, Ontario, Canada.

Total sales

Trim levels
1990–1995 models came in a single unnamed trim level, from here on referred to as "base."

Current
Limited – 1999–2016
Limited Platinum – 2015–2016 (US only)
Premium – 2015–2016 (Canada only)
Touring-L – 2011–2016
Touring – 2004–2016
LX – 1996–2010; 2015–2016 (known from 2015 on as LI in Mexico)
S – 2013–2016 (US and Canada only)
(these current trim levels exclude Pacifica)

Former
Base – 1989–1996; 2004–2007 (replaced by LX for model years 1997–1999, Voyager for model years 2001–2003)
LXi – 1996–2003
SX – 1997–1999
eX – 2001–2004
eL – 2002–2003

Special Edition Trims
Touring Platinum Series – 2004–2007
Walter P. Chrysler Signature Series – 2005–2010
25th Anniversary Edition – 2009
Touring Signature Series – 2006–2007
Spring Special Edition – 2006–2007
Tanya Moss Limited Edition – 2013 (Mexico only; special paint color and badging, total production 150 units)
30th Anniversary Edition – 2014
90th Anniversary Edition – 2016

Seating innovation
Chrysler has regularly innovated new seating systems for their minivans, to enhance interior flexibility.

Quad command
Introduced in 1990 for the 1991 model year, Chrysler marketed second-row "captains chairs" as a substitute to the "partial bench" second-row seat.

Integrated child safety seats
In 1991 introduced a second-row bench seat integrating two child booster seats. These seats have continued as an available option through Generation 5.

Easy-Out Roller Seats
In 1995, Chrysler introduced a system of seats to simplify installation, removal, and re-positioning— marketed as Easy-Out Roller Seats. When installed, the seats are latched to floor-mounted strikers. When unlatched, eight rollers lift each seat, allowing it to be rolled fore and aft. Tracks have locator depressions for rollers, thus enabling simple installation. Ergonomic levers at the seatbacks release the floor latches single-handedly without tools and raise the seats onto the rollers in a single motion. Additionally, seatbacks were designed to fold forward. Seat roller tracks are permanently attached to the floor and seat stanchions are aligned, facilitating the longitudinal rolling of the seats. Bench seat stanchions were moved inboard to reduce bending stress in the seat frames, allowing them to be lighter.

When configured as two- and three-person benches (available through Generation IV), the Easy Out Roller Seats could be unwieldy. Beginning in 2000, second- and third-row seats became available in a 'quad' configuration — bucket or captain chairs in the second row and a third-row three-person 50/50 split "bench" — with each section weighing under 50 lbs. The Easy-out system remained in use through Generation V — where certain models featured a two-person bench and the under-floor compartments from the Stow'n Go system.

The Volkswagen Routan, a rebadged nameplate variant of the Chrysler minivans, used the Easy Out Roller Seats on its second-row seating. These were made available on upper trims the Town and Country after the discontinuation of the Swivel 'n Go seats.

Stow'n Go seating
In 2005, Chrysler introduced a system of second- and third-row seating that folded completely into under-floor compartments — marketed as Stow 'n Go seating and exclusively available on long-wheelbase models.

In a development program costing $400 million, engineers used an erector set to initially help visualize the complex interaction of the design and redesigned underfloor components to accommodate the system — including the spare tire well, fuel tank, exhaust system, parking brake cables, rear climate control lines, and the rear suspension. However, the new seating system precluded incorporation of an AWD system, effectively ending that option for the Chrysler minivans.

The Stow 'n Go system received Popular Science magazine's "Best of What's New" for 2005 award.

The Stow 'n Go system was not offered on the (now discontinued) Volkswagen Routan, a rebadged nameplate variant of the Chrysler minivans.

The Stow 'n Go seating and storage system in the Town & Country and Dodge Grand Caravan was improved, revised, and renamed "Super Stow 'n Go" for the 2011 model year. This system is still on the Grand Caravan and was adapted for the new Pacifica.

Swivel 'n Go
Chrysler introduced a seating system in 2008, marketed as Swivel'n Go. In the system, the two second-row seats swivel to face the third row. A detachable table can be placed between the second and third-row seats. Swivel'n Go is available with Stow 'n Go seating after 2008 models. The Swivel 'n Go system is offered on the Dodge Caravan, but not the Volkswagen Routan, a rebadged nameplate variant of the Chrysler minivans.

These Swivel 'n Go Seats were manufactured by Intier, a division of Magna. The tracks, risers, and swivel mechanisms are assembled by Camslide, a division of Intier. The swivel mechanism was designed by and is produced by Toyo Seat USA Corp.

The system is noted for its high strength. The entire load of the seat in the event of a crash is transferred through the swivel mechanism, which is almost twice as strong as the minimum government requirement.

The swivel mechanism includes bumpers that stabilize the seat while in the lock position. When rotated the seat comes off these bumpers to allow easy rotation.

The seat is not meant to be left in an unlocked position or swiveled with the occupant in it, although this will not damage the swivel mechanism.

Swivel 'n Go was dropped from the 2011 line of Chrysler and Dodge minivans due to a lack of consumer interest.

Minivan production
Chrysler Town & Country and Dodge Grand Caravan minivans with Stow 'n Go & Swivel 'n Go seats are built in Windsor, Ontario.

Two plants have had the task of building the Town & Country, with Saint Louis Assembly building it from 1989 to 2001, and Windsor from 2001 to the present. As of May 2006, Windsor Assembly will be the lead producer of the RT, but will not fully take over until 2009 when they phase out current production of the Pacifica (CS). Saint Louis Assembly minivan plant was closed in October 2008 making Windsor the sole producer of the Chrysler Town & Country and Dodge Grand Caravan.

Taiwanese-market Town & Country minivans were assembled in Yangmei, Taiwan under license by the China Motor Corporation, starting with the 2006 model year. They are based on the European market Chrysler Grand Voyager with the 3.3L engine, with minor changes for the local market including LED taillights and backup cameras. In 2007, production ended and the production line was relocated to China where Soueast continued to assemble it under the Chrysler Grand Voyager and Dodge Grand Caravan nameplates from 2008 until late 2010.

From 1991 to 2007 Chrysler Voyager/Grand Voyager cars were assembled in Austria and sold out in Europe and in many other global markets. Since 2008 the European-Version is also produced in Ontario, although diesel engines are still available, and the trim is also different. From the outside the cars look very similar to the North American Town & Country Model, but are sold as the Chrysler Grand Voyager.

The Town & Country is also marketed in Mexico, Venezuela, and from 2011 on, in Brazil, as it was previously sold there rebadged as the Chrysler Caravan.

Town & Country Plug-in hybrid

In September 2008, Chrysler unveiled a plug-in hybrid version of the Town & Country along with similarly engineered 4-door Jeep Wrangler and a purely electric sports car. The Town & Country prototype had an all-electric range of  before gasoline starts. However, in November 2009 Fiat SpA disbanded Chrysler's ENVI electric car division and dropped these models from future product plans.

A two-year demonstration program with 25 flexible-fuel plug-in minivans began in April 2012. The first Town and Country were delivered in Auburn Hills, Michigan and Charlotte, North Carolina. The -million demonstration project is partially financed by a  million grant from the U.S. Department of Energy (DOE). The plug-in hybrid minivans are equipped with an E85-compatible 3.6 L Pentastar engine mated to a front-wheel-drive, with two-mode hybrid transmission. The plug-in hybrid is powered by a liquid-cooled 12.1 KWh lithium-ion battery that delivers a total output of 290 horsepower.

A plug-in hybrid version of the next-generation Chrysler minivan launched in the U.S. in late 2016.

Fire incident

In September 2012 Chrysler temporarily suspended the demonstration program. All 109 Dodge Ram 1500 Plug-in Hybrids and 23 Chrysler Town & Country plug-in hybrids deployed by the program were recalled due to damage sustained by three separate pickup trucks when their 12.9 kWh battery packs overheated. The carmaker plans to upgrade the battery packs with cells that use different lithium-ion chemistry before the vehicles go back on service. Chrysler explained that no one was injured from any of the incidents, and the vehicles were not occupied at the time, nor any of the minivans were involved in any incident, but they were withdrawn as a precaution. The demonstration is a program jointly funded by Chrysler and the U.S. Department of Energy that includes the first-ever factory-produced vehicles capable of reverse power flow. The experimental system would allow fleet operators to use their plug-in hybrids to supply electricity for a building during a power outage, reduce power usage when electric rates are high, or even sell electricity back to their utility company. The company reported that the demonstration fleet had collectively accumulated 1.3 million miles (2.1 million km) before the vehicles were recalled.

References

External links
 
 https://web.archive.org/web/20060214183457/http://auto.consumerguide.com/ :Chrysler Town & Country

External links

 Chrysler.com – Official Chrysler Town & Country homepage
 Chrysler.com – 2001 Town & Country homepage, through Internet Archive

All-wheel-drive vehicles
Town and Country
Front-wheel-drive vehicles
Minivans
1980s cars
1990s cars
2000s cars
2010s cars
Cars introduced in 1989
Cars discontinued in 2016